Chennadu is a small village 7 km away from Erattupetta in the Kottayam district of the Indian state of Kerala. The name is derived from chennu ninna nadu. It has a church, temple, high school and an LP school.
Main agricultural crop is rubber. It stands as the most popular economic support for the village.

References

Villages in Kottayam district